Kapaklı can refer to the following places in Turkey:

 Kapaklı, a district of Tekirdağ Province
 Kapaklı, Alaca
 Kapaklı, Burdur
 Kapaklı, Daday, a village
 Kapaklı, Kızılırmak
 Kapaklı, Kurşunlu
 Kapaklı, Manyas